Križe is a settlement in the Municipality of Brežice in eastern Slovenia. The area is part of the traditional region of Styria. It is now included in the Lower Sava Statistical Region.

References

External links
Križe on Geopedia

Populated places in the Municipality of Brežice